The 1996–97 season was the 82nd season of the Isthmian League, which is an English football competition featuring semi-professional and amateur clubs from London, East and South East England. The league consisted of four divisions.

Premier Division

The Premier Division consisted of 22 clubs, including 18 clubs from the previous season and four new clubs:
 Dagenham & Redbridge, relegated from the Football Conference
 Heybridge Swifts, promoted as runners-up in Division One
 Oxford City, promoted as champions of Division One
 Staines Town, promoted as third in Division One

League table

Division One

Division One consisted of 22 clubs, including 16 clubs from the previous season and six new teams:

Three clubs relegated from the Premier Division:
 Molesey
 Walton & Hersham
 Worthing

Three clubs promoted from Division Two:
 Canvey Island
 Croydon
 Hampton

League table

Division Two

Division Two consisted of 22 clubs, including 17 clubs from the previous season and five new clubs:

Two clubs relegated from Division One:
 Barking
 Wembley

Three clubs promoted from Division Three:
 Horsham
 Leighton Town
 Windsor & Eton

Also, Collier Row & Romford, formed from a merger between Collier Row and Romford

League table

Division Three

Division Three consisted of 17 clubs, including 16 clubs from the previous season and one new club:

 Braintree Town, transferred from Southern League Southern Division

Before the start of the season Cove and Harefield United resigned from the league.

League table

See also
Isthmian League
1996–97 Northern Premier League
1996–97 Southern Football League

References

Isthmian League seasons
6